Tractor Sports Club Academy are the youth team of Tractor Sports Club that was founded in 2011. Tractor Club Football Academy, the first academy in Iran that matches commands AFC started to work.

Teams
Tractor Academy had 4 teams in the different ages, -14, -16, -19 and -21.

Notable played in the adult team
1970s

1980s

1990s

2000s

References

External links
 pictures from Tractor Academy Farsnews Agency
 گزارشی از آکادمی فوتبال باشگاه تراکتورسازی تبریز dananews.

Tractor S.C.
Sport in Tabriz
Football academies in Iran